Virbia xanthopleura is a moth in the family Erebidae first described by George Hampson in 1898. It is found in Grenada.

References

xanthopleura
Moths described in 1898